Guido Messina (4 January 1931 – 10 January 2020) was an Italian road and track cyclist. 

He was born in Monreale, Italy, on 4 January 1931. On track he won five world titles in the individual 4000 m pursuit between 1948 and 1956, and a gold medal with the Italian team at the 1952 Olympics (individual pursuit became an Olympic event only in 1964, when Messina retired from cycling). Between 1954 and 1963 he rode professionally and won the first stage of the 1955 Giro d'Italia. He died six days after his 89th birthday on 10 January 2020.

References

External links

 
 
 

1931 births
2020 deaths
People from Monreale
Italian male cyclists
Cyclists at the 1952 Summer Olympics
Olympic cyclists of Italy
Olympic gold medalists for Italy
Olympic medalists in cycling
Sportspeople from the Province of Palermo
UCI Track Cycling World Champions (men)
Medalists at the 1952 Summer Olympics
Italian track cyclists
Italian Giro d'Italia stage winners
Cyclists from Sicily